Peeksville may refer to:

Places

United States
Peeksville, Georgia
Peeksville, Wisconsin
Peeksville (community), Wisconsin